The Glimpse is an album by British jazz pianist Robert Mitchell. It was released on 18 February 2013 by Whirlwind Recordings.

Track listing

 Amino (Improvisation)
 Zuni Lore
 Prelude No 6 (Pour La Main Gauche)
 Leftitude (Improvisation)
 The Defiant Gene
 The Sage
 A Confession
 Lullaby No 1 (Infinite Ivy)
 The Re-Emergent
 Nocturne for the Left Hand Alone
 The Glimpse
 Alice's Touch (Improvisation)

Credits
 Robert Mitchell - Grand Piano
 Produced by Pat Thomas
 Recorded and mastered by Roland Clarke 
 Cover art - Sally Pannifex
 Cover photo - Robert Mitchell
 Back cover photo - Alvise Guadagnino
 Recorded at The Capstone Theatre, Liverpool, UK on 30/31 August 2012, on their bespoke Steinway D Grand Piano
 Executive Producer - Michael Janisch

References

2013 albums